Antennaria neglecta  is a North American species of flowering plants in the family Asteraceae known by the common name field pussytoes. It is widespread across much of Canada (including Northwest Territories plus all provinces except Newfoundland and Labrador) as well as the northeastern and north-central United States.

Antennaria neglecta  is an herb up to 25 cm (10 inches) tall with as many as 8 flowering heads per plant. Male and female flowers are borne on separate plants, some populations being composed entirely of female plants.

References

External links
 
 
 
 
Plants of the Eloise Butler Wildflower Garden 

neglecta
Plants described in 1897
Flora of Canada
Flora of the Northwestern United States
Flora of the North-Central United States
Flora of the Southeastern United States
Flora of the Northeastern United States
Flora without expected TNC conservation status